Nicole Y. Weekes is an American psychologist and neuroscientist whose work focuses on the psychological and biological response to stress. She is the Harry S. and L. Madge Rice Thatcher Professor of Psychological Science and Professor of Neuroscience at Pomona College in Claremont, California.

Early life 
Weekes earned her bachelor's degree from Boston University and her doctorate from the University of California, Los Angeles.

Career 
Weekes began teaching at Pomona College in 1998. In 2016, she was appointed Associate Dean of Faculty to help lead efforts to further diversify its ranks. She has won the Wig Distinguished Professor Award, the college's highest faculty honor, in recognition of her teaching on three occasions, in 2001, 2006, and 2011.

References

External links
Faculty page at Pomona College

Year of birth missing (living people)
Living people
Pomona College faculty
American women neuroscientists
American neuroscientists
American women psychologists
21st-century American psychologists
University of California, Los Angeles alumni
Boston University alumni
African-American psychologists
21st-century African-American people
21st-century African-American women